Alexander Moodie (30 September 1886 – 21 May 1968) was a Scottish international rugby union player who played for University of St Andrews RFC in St Andrews, Fife.

Early life

Born in Balmuirfield, Dundee in 1886, the son of David Moodie, a bleacher, Moodie attended the High School of Dundee and the University of St Andrews.

Rugby Union career

Amateur career

Moodie played rugby union for St. Andrews University.

Provincial career

He played for the Midlands District in their match against North of Scotland District on 19 November 1910.

He played for the combined North of Scotland District against the South of Scotland District on 10 December 1910.

He played for the Whites Trial side against the Blues Trial side on 21 January 1911, while still playing with St. Andrews University.

International career

Moodie played in 3 tests for Scotland. The first was in the last Home Nations tournament in 1909. He played against England on 20 March 1909 in Richmond, London. Scotland won the match 18-8.

His next two matches were against France in the new Five Nations tournament of 1910 and 1911. He played against France on 22 January 1910 at Inverleith. Scotland won that match 27-0. His last match for Scotland was in Colombes, France on 2 January 1911. France won that match 16-15.

References

External links
ESPN Profile
England v Scotland 20 March 1909 Match Report
Scotland v France 22 January 1910 Match Report
France v Scotland 2 January 1911 Match Report

1886 births
1968 deaths
People educated at the High School of Dundee
Alumni of the University of St Andrews
Scottish rugby union players
University of St Andrews RFC players
Scotland international rugby union players
Rugby union players from Dundee
Whites Trial players
North of Scotland (combined side) players
Midlands District players
Rugby union forwards